This was the first edition of the tournament. It was originally scheduled to take place in Florianópolis (hard court) but was relocated to São Paulo (clay court) and took the São Paulo Challenger de Tênis namesake after restrictions in Santa Catarina state due to the COVID-19 pandemic.

Felipe Meligeni Alves won the title after defeating Frederico Ferreira Silva 6–2, 7–6(7–1) in the final.

Seeds

Draw

Finals

Top half

Bottom half

References

External links
Main draw
Qualifying draw

São Paulo Challenger de Tênis - Singles
2020 Singles